Coleophora ortrina is a moth of the family Coleophoridae. It is found in Russia (Ussuri).

References

ortrina
Moths described in 1976
Moths of Asia